The 1968 Dudley by-election was a by-election held for the British House of Commons constituency of Dudley in Worcestershire on 28 March 1968.  It was won by the Conservative Party candidate Donald Williams.

Vacancy 
The seat had become vacant when the Labour Member of Parliament (MP), George Wigg had been appointed Chairman of the Horserace Betting Levy Board on 16 November 1967. He had held the seat since the 1945 general election and had served as Paymaster General in the Government of Harold Wilson. He was also elevated to the House of Lords as Baron Wigg, of the Borough of Dudley.

Result 
The result was a clear victory for Williams in what had been a Labour safe seat.  It was one of the three Conservative by-election gains from Labour on the same day, the others being at Acton and Meriden.

Williams held the seat until the 1970 general election, when he lost the seat back to the Labour candidate, John Gilbert.

Votes

References 

By-elections to the Parliament of the United Kingdom in Worcestershire constituencies
1968 in England
1968 elections in the United Kingdom
By-elections to the Parliament of the United Kingdom in West Midlands (county) constituencies
Politics of Dudley
20th century in Worcestershire
March 1968 events in the United Kingdom